The 2020 Pan American Taekwondo Olympic Qualification Tournament for the Tokyo Olympic Games took place in Palacio de los Deportes, Heredia, Costa Rica. The tournament was held from 11 to 12 March 2020. Each country may enter a maximum of 2 male and 2 female divisions with only one athlete in each division. The winner and runner-up athletes per division qualify for the Olympic Games under their NOC.

Qualification summary

Results

Men

−58 kg
12 March

−68 kg
11 March

−80 kg
12 March

+80 kg
11 March

Women

−49 kg
12 March

−57 kg
11 March

−67 kg
12 March

+67 kg
11 March

References

1st day Draw

External links
 World Taekwondo Federation

Olympic Qualification
Taekwondo Olympic Qual
Taekwondo qualification for the 2020 Summer Olympics
2020 in Costa Rican sport
Pan American Taekwondo Olympic Qualification Tournament